Goromonzi is a rural community in East Mashonaland, Zimbabwe,  southeast of the country's capital city of Harare. The people are principally from the Shona tribe. The village serves as a trading centre for commercial, communal and co-operative farms. It is also the administrative centre for the Chinyika communal land and Goromonzi District. The community is located on a subsidiary road north of the A3 highway to Harare.

Notes

Goromonzi District
Populated places in Mashonaland East Province